Parascutigera peluda is a species of centipede in the Scutigeridae family. It is endemic to Australia. It was first described in 2009 by Gregory Edgecombe.

Distribution
The species occurs in Queensland. The type locality is Mahogany Forest, Mount Moffatt National Park, Central Queensland.

References

 

 
peluda
Centipedes of Australia
Endemic fauna of Australia
Fauna of Queensland
Animals described in 2009
Taxa named by Gregory Edgecombe